Nice People may refer to:

 Nice People (play), 1921 play by Rachel Crothers
 Nice People (film), 1922 silent film directed by William C. deMille
 Nice People (TV France), French reality TV series